Necdet Mahfi Ayral (August 6, 1908 in Istanbul – June 6, 2004 in Istanbul) was a well-known Turkish stage and cinema actor, as well as theatre director. While alive, he held the record for being the oldest Turkish actor who was still active. He is father of actress and well-known voice-over artist Jeyan Ayral Tözüm.

Filmography
 1933 - Cici Berber
 1933 - Fena Yol (O Kakos Dhromos)
 1933 - Söz Bir Allah Bir
 1934 - Milyon Avcıları
 1940 - Akasya Palas
 1940 - Şehvet Kurbanı
 1944 - Hürriyet Apartmanı
 1946 - Domaniç Yolcusu / Unutulan Sır
 1949 - Efsuncu Baba
 1950 - Akdeniz Korsanları
 1951 - İstanbul Kan Ağlarken
 1952 - Adak Tepe
 1952 - Edi İle Büdü Tiyatrocu
 1953 - Soygun
 1955 - Kadının Fendi
 1955 - Sihirli Boru
 1961 - Naylon Leyla
 1961 - Sahte Prens
 1965 - Hep O Şarkı
 1966 - Koca Yusuf
 1977 - Gülünüz Güldürünüz
 1996 - Eşkıya
 1997 - Hamam
 1997 - Mektup
 2000 - Canlı Hayat

References

External links

1908 births
2004 deaths
Turkish male stage actors
Turkish male film actors
Turkish theatre directors